Millimages is a French independent animation studio based in Paris which develops, produces and worldwide distributes high quality family entertainment on all media.

In 2016, Millimages has been nominated for an International Emmy Kids Award with its bestseller show Molang.

Productions

Feature films

TV Specials

TV series

Awards

References

External links 
Millimages

French animation studios
Mass media companies established in 1991